Lyakhovitsy is a rural locality (a selo) in Seletskoye Rural Settlement, Suzdalsky District, Vladimir Oblast, Russia. The population was 96 as of 2010. There are 4 streets.

Geography 
Lyakhovitsy is located 11 km east of Suzdal (the district's administrative centre) by road. Bereznitsy is the nearest rural locality.

References 

Rural localities in Suzdalsky District
Suzdalsky Uyezd